The 1970 1000 km Buenos Aires was an endurance sports car event held in Buenos Aires, Argentina with international competitors.

Official results
Class winners in bold.  Cars failing to complete 70% of the winner's distance marked as Not Classified (NC).

References

1000 km Buenos Aires
1000 km Buenos Aires
1000km